Prati Roju Pandage is a 2019 Indian Telugu-language comedy-drama film written and directed by Maruthi. The film was produced by Bunny Vasu and Sreenivasa Kumar Naidu (SKN) under GA2 Pictures and UV Creations with Sai Tej, Raashii Khanna, Sathyaraj and Rao Ramesh in the lead roles. The technical crew includes Jaikumar behind the camera, S. Thaman composing music and Kotagiri Venkateswara Rao handling editing duties. The movie depicts the relationship between a grandson and his grandfather and how society treats old people. Under the dubbing and production of Goldmines Telefilms, the film was dubbed in Hindi as Har Din Diwali and aired on Sony Max during the diwali time. It was also uploaded on Goldmines Telefilms Official YouTube Channel on the same day.

Plot 
Raghu Ramayya is over 75 years old. One day, Raghu Ramayya goes to a hospital and asks Dr. Bharath about his condition. Bharath tells him that he has lung cancer. Raghu Ramayya informs his eldest son Anand Rao that he has cancer. Anand Rao asks Bharath how much time his father has. Bharath replies that he has very little time to live. Even though Anand Rao was skeptical about it, he plans to come to India with his siblings. Meanwhile, Sai Tej gets to know the conditions his grandfather is suffering from and travels to India to stay with him and fulfill his wishes. While he was in India, Raghu Ramayya suggests him to marry his friend's, Surya Narayan, granddaughter, Angel Aarna. But Anand Rao fixes a marriage plan with his boss' (Dhamodhar) daughter. Anand Rao gets to know that Sai Tej is in love with Angel Aarna and he also gets to know that Raghu Ramayya is behind this. After a few weeks, Raghu Ramayya's kids come to India to take care of him. Raghu Ramayya gets so happy and one day he passes out. He is immediately taken to a hospital, Anand Rao thinking that his dad is dead tells this to Dhamodhar. But after a few minutes, Bharath comes and tells the real news that Raghu Ramayya was not dead but due to much happiness(of seeing his kids) had fainted, and Anand Rao realizes he is in big trouble.

As days pass on, everyone gets frustrated because they are staying in India for too long and the workload is getting too much. To keep them here, Sai Tej creates a fake "surprise" so that they can stay here and look after their father. One fine day, the whole family does a ritual. While Nagaraju and Nagaraju's brother comes to the family to warn them they will have to take the property that Raghu Ramayya visits every day. But Sai Tej beats them up. Later that day, Dhamodhar comes to India to visit Anand Rao and console him. But he learns the truth and he scolds him. Now, Anand Rao gets angry at his father and blames him for what has happened. Everyone leaves him and back to their home except Sai Tej.

But Raghu Ramayya gets seriously ill and is admitted to the hospital. Sai Tej calls his dad and tells him that his father is dead but he says that he cannot attend the death ritual. Eventually, the other two brothers and the only sister of Anand Rao also deny it. But they suggest that Sai Tej do the rituals and they will attend it through video call. Sai Tej gets angry after hearing this and the video call shows that he was not doing the ritual for his grandfather but for his father, uncles, and aunt. Seeing this, they get frustrated and they come back to India to confront him. But Sai Tej tells them how Raghu Ramayya contributed to their children's well-being and how he wanted all of his kids, grandsons, and granddaughters to have a bright future. All of them regret treating their father so badly in his older days and realize their mistake. To everyone's surprise, Sai Tej tells them that their father is not dead and is alive. Then, Raghu Ramayya comes and all the family reconciles. Later, Sai Tej and Angel Aarna marry. And in the end credits, it is shown that when Raghu Ramayya was going to fall all his kids hold him and save him. And when he asks them for his stick, they say that there is no need for a stick as they are his support. The film ends with a moral that if the children shower the same love and affection on their parents that they gave them when they were young, then every day will be celebrated as a festival, never forget that the children will also turn into parents.

Cast 

 Panja Sai Dharam Tej as Sai Tej
 Raashii Khanna as Aarna (Angel)
 Sathyaraj as Raghu Ramayya
 Rao Ramesh as Anand Rao
 Vijayakumar as Surya Narayana
 Naresh as Naresh Prasad (Cameo Appearance)
 Murali Sharma as Dhamodhar
 Ajay as Nagaraju
 Satyam Rajesh as Nagaraju's brother
 Gayatri Bharghavi as Raghu Ramayya's daughter 
 Hari Teja as Geetha
 Praveen as Harish
 Bharath Reddy as Dr. Bharath
 Prabha as Jaanaki "Jaanu" (Cameo Appearance)
 Suhas as Suhas, Sai's friend
 Mahesh Achanta as Mahesh, Ramayya's assistant 
 Srikanth Iyyengar as Sai's uncle
Rajitha
Bhadram as Geetha's brother

Production

Launch 
The film launched formally in June 2019 by performing pooja and muhurat shots. Dil Raju attended the event along with the film cast and crew.

Filming 
The regular filming started in early July in Hyderabad. The production moved to Rajamundry for the village sequences in September 2019.

Soundtrack 

The music was composed by S. Thaman.

Release 
The film was released on 20 December 2019. It was later dubbed and released in Hindi as Har Din Diwali by Goldmines Telefilms on 15 November 2020.

Home media 
The film was made available to stream on OTT platform Disney+ Hotstar on 3 February 2020.

Reception

Box office 
In two days Prati Roju Pandage collected 12.09 crores gross and 7 crores share worldwide.
In four days, the movie collected 25 crores gross worldwide.
In six days, the movie collected 33.80 crores gross and 18.43 crores share worldwide.
In the full run, Prati Roju Pandage collected 62 crores gross and 34 crores share worldwide and emerged as the highest-grossing movie of both Maruthi and Sai Tej.

Critical reception 
Y Sunita Chowdhary of The Hindu wrote " The film has nice visuals and the content is strong as it focuses on sensitivity towards family values, especially in the climax. Maruti deserves a pat for his simple and straight dialogues and Sai Dharam Tej does well in disciplining the elders".
Firstpost gave 3.25 out of 5 stars stating "Prathi Roju Pandage into a discourse on how we engage with our parents and grandparents in their old age. It has its share of laughs and emotional moments. It manages to deliver what it sets out to achieve, even if the journey is a little shaky in a few stretches".
The Times of India gave 2.5 out of 5 stars stating "Satyaraj, Rao Ramesh, Murli Sharma, Hari Teja and Raashi Khanna, even in the limited role, hit the ball out of the park. The cinematography by Jayakumar is apt and Thaman S' BGM works well for the film. Prati Roju Pandaage has ample moments that’ll make you smile and relate to the characters, if not anything else".

See also  
 Sathamanam Bhavati
 Ammammagarillu

References

External links 
 

2010s Telugu-language films
2019 films
Films shot in Hyderabad, India
Indian family films
Indian romantic comedy-drama films
2019 romantic comedy-drama films
Films shot in Andhra Pradesh
Films set in Andhra Pradesh
Films shot in Rajahmundry
Films set in Konaseema
Indian comedy-drama films
Films directed by Maruthi